Fiston is a 2014 French comedy film directed by Pascal Bourdiaux and starring Franck Dubosc and Kev Adams.

Cast
 Kev Adams: Alex
 Franck Dubosc: Antoine Chamoine
 Nora Arnezeder: Sandra
 Valérie Benguigui: Sophie 
 Helena Noguerra: Monica 
 Alice Isaaz: Elie
 Laurent Bateau: Benoît Legrand
 Danièle Évenou: Gigi

References

External links
 

2014 films
2014 comedy films
French comedy films
2010s French-language films
2010s French films